Sir Thomas Bisset (died 1366) Lord of Upsetlington, was a Scottish knight who was a crusader and by his second marriage was jure exoris Earl of Fife between 1363 and 1366, when he died.

Life
Thomas was the grandson of William Bisset of Upsettlington. He is known to have been a crusader, participating in a campaign in Prussia. For his second marriage he betrothed Isabella, Countess of Fife. Thomas was her third husband. They had no issue when he died in 1366.

He was succeeded by his son Thomas, from his wife of his first marriage, whose name is currently unknown.

Citations

References
 

1366 deaths

Year of birth unknown
Scottish knights
Thomas
People from the Scottish Borders
14th-century Scottish people